Kate Gilmore is a stage and television actress from Artane, Dublin best known for playing Karen O'Neill in RTÉ One's Fair City. She has played Lucy in Striking Out since 2017.

In 2015, she won an Irish Times Theatre Award for Best Supporting Actress. In 2016 she starred with Sam Keeley in The Nation Holds Its Breath, a short film directed by Kev Cahill. In 2012 she participated in the first series of The Voice of Ireland as part of Bressie's team, before being eliminated at the "battles" stage.

She is an only child.

References

Year of birth missing (living people)
Date of birth missing (living people)
People from Artane, Dublin
Actresses from Dublin (city)
Irish stage actresses
Irish television actresses
The Voice of Ireland
Living people